Come and Praise is a hymnal published by the BBC and widely used in collective worship in British schools. The hymnal was compiled by Geoffrey Marshall-Taylor with musical arrangements by Douglas Coombes, and includes well-known hymns such as “Oil in My Lamp”, “Kum Ba Yah” and “Water of Life” as well as Christmas carols and Easter hymns.

Volumes
Two volumes were published: Come and Praise in 1978, and Come and Praise 2 in 1988.  The hymns from both volumes were published together in The Complete Come and Praise in 1990.

CDs

CD 1 

 Morning has broken
 Water of life
 All things bright and beautiful
 Autumn days
 Somebody greater
 The earth is yours, O God
 Let us with a gladsome mind
 Who put the colours in the rainbow?
 Song of Caedmon
 All nations of the earth
 God knows me
 When God made the garden of creation
 Think of a world without any flowers
 He made me
 He's got the whole world
 Come my brothers, praise the Lord
 Come and praise the Lord our King
 Lord of the dance
 Go tell it on the mountain
 When Jesus walked in Galilee
 Jesus Christ is here
 A man for all people
 Judas and Mary
 From the darkness came light
 Join with us
 God has promised
 Thank you Lord
 Praise the Lord in everything
 God is love

CD 2 

 Praise Him
 Fill thou my life
 Travel on
 Give me oil in my lamp
 He who would valiant be
 The journey of life
 One more step
 Father, hear the prayer we offer
 We are climbing
 When a knight won his spurs
 Lord of all hopefulness
 Peace, perfect peace
 The King of love
 Colours of day
 The Lord's my shepherd
 Lost and found
 The best gift
 I listen and I listen
 The building song
 Spirit of God
 The wise may bring their learning
 When I needed a neighbour
 In Christ there is no east or west
 Black and White
 Kum ba yah
 The family of Man
 Cross over the road
 If I had a hammer
 A living song

References

Hymnals
1978 books
1988 books